Chinese Take-Away is a 2011 Argentine comedy-drama film written and directed by Sebastián Borensztein. The film was the highest grossing non-US film in Argentina in 2011.

Plot 
Roberto is a veteran who is characterised by orderliness and a firm belief in the value of control. He runs his own hardware store accordingly. If a supplier sells him boxes with 100 screws each, he counts all the screws and files a complaint if just a single one is missing. He feels that the world around his isle of neatness has gone mad. In order to prove his point, he collects newspaper articles about grotesque mishaps originally triggered by a lack of diligence. From time to time he is visited by Mari, a woman who is in love with him and wants to live with him.

While Roberto believes he has his life under control and is safe from surprises, he is confronted by an appalling incident. A Chinese man, Jun, is thrown out of a moving taxi in front of Roberto's eyes. Roberto helps him and tries to put things right again, as it is his nature. This is particularly difficult because neither one speaks the other one's language and Roberto is absolutely not in the habit of asking anybody for help. However, they find a delivery guy from a Chinese restaurant who translates for them. Jun and Roberto encounter several mishaps in the midst of trying to resolve Jun's situation.

Jun discloses to Roberto he came to Argentina to find his uncle. Roberto explains to Jun that he has become such a grumpy man because his world view has been shattered by the Falklands war. Then Roberto provides an example on what he means when he considers the whole world gone mad. He shows Jun his collection of newspaper articles and points out the article about a Chinese girl who was killed by a cow that fell out of a moving aircraft. Yet Jun knows this story already since she was his fiancée and he actually came to Argentina because everything in China reminded him of this tragedy.

Eventually, Jun is able to connect with his uncle who lives in Mendoza. Roberto drives him to the airport and Jun gets on a plane to reunite with his uncle. Roberto tries to return to his quiet and ordered life but then travels to Mari's hometown to find her.

Cast
 Ricardo Darín as Roberto
 Muriel Santa Ana as Mari
 Ignacio Huang as Jun
 Enric Cambray as Roberto as a Young Man (as Enric Rodríguez)
 Iván Romanelli as Leonel

Accolades

References

External links
 

2011 comedy films
2011 films
Argentine comedy films
2010s Spanish-language films
Films shot in Buenos Aires
Films set in Buenos Aires
Films scored by Lucio Godoy
2010s Argentine films